The 1906 Copa del Rey Final was the 4th final of the Copa del Rey, the Spanish football cup competition. The match took place on 10 April 1906 at the Hipódromo, Madrid. The match was contested by Athletic Bilbao and Madrid FC, and saw Madrid FC win 4-1 with braces from Manuel Prast and Pedro Parages, thus lifting the trophy for the second time in their history.

Match details

See also
El Viejo Clásico

References

Copa
Copa del Rey Finals
Copa Del Rey Final 1906
Copa Del Rey Final 1906